Life Force Radio is the second studio album by American rapper Afu-Ra. It was released on May 21, 2002 via Koch Records. The album's audio production was handled by Arabian Knight, Ayatollah, Curt Cazal, Domingo, Easy Mo Bee, Eric S, Kenny Muhammad The Human Orchestra, Needlz, True Master, Woogie, and DJ Premier, who also served as executive producer. It featured guest appearances from Alana Da Fonseca, Big Daddy Kane, Don Parmazhane, GangStarr, Jahdan Blakkamoore, Kenny Muhammad The Human Orchestra, M.O.P., Quinnes Parker, RZA, Teena Marie, The Blob, and A-Sun & Respect from Perverted Monks.

Track listing

Personnel

 Aaron Phillip – main performer
 Antonio Hardy – guest performer (track 3)
 Eric Murray – guest performer (track 5)
 Jamal Grinnage – guest performer (track 5)
 Mary Christine Brockert – guest performer (track 6)
 Wayne Sharne Henry – guest performer (track 13)
 Kenny Muhammad The Human Orchestra – guest performer & producer (track 14)
 Don Parmazhane – guest performer (track 15)
 The B.L.O.B. – guest performer (track 15)
 Robert Fitzgerald Diggs – guest performer (track 16)
 Keith Edward Elam – guest performer (track 17)
 R.C.A. – guest performer (track 19)
 Gary Grice – guest performer (track 20)
 A-Sun a.k.a. Solar Monk – vocals (track 1)
 Russell Ballenger Jr. – additional vocals (track 4)
 Alana Da Fonseca – additional vocals (track 8)
 Quinnes Diamond Parker – additional vocals (track 11)
 David Sechy – bass & piano (track 2)
 Eric S – drums (track 2), producer (tracks: 2, 5)
 Arnold Lloyd Miot – guitar (track 4)
 Frederick Kraai – saxophone (track 6)
 Gavin "Natty Dred" Daly – trombone & trumpet (track 6), autoharp (track 14)
 Joe Quinde – guitar (track 8)
 Doug Grama – bass (track 11)
 Diego Campo – guitar & keyboards (track 13)
 Rory Jackson – bass (track 13)
 Adam Deitch – drums (track 13)
 Woogie – producer (track 1)
 Curtis Andre Small – producer (tracks: 3, 12)
 Osten Harvey Jr. – producer (tracks: 4, 9, 11)
 Domingo Padilla – producer (track 6)
 Christopher Edward Martin – producer (tracks: 7, 17), executive producer
 Khari Cain – producer (track 8)
 Lamont Dorrell – producer (track 13)
 Suleyman Ansari – producer (track 15)
 Derek Harris – producer (track 16)
 Hashim Elobied – producer (track 18)
 Eric Steinen – producer (track 19), mixing (track 1), engineering
 Kieran Walsh – mixing (tracks: 2-6, 8-13, 15-16)
 Norberto Cotto – mixing (tracks: 7, 17)
 Rock – mixing (track 14)
 Dejuana Richardson – engineering 
 Dexter Thibou – engineering
 Leo "Swift" Morris – engineering
 Robert Green Brooks – additional engineering (track 6)
 Tony Dawson – mastering
 Jeff Gilligan – art direction & design
 Alex Ostroy – illustration

Album chart positions

Singles chart positions

References

External links 

2002 albums
Afu-Ra albums
Albums produced by Ayatollah
Albums produced by DJ Premier
Albums produced by Domingo (producer)
Albums produced by Easy Mo Bee
Albums produced by Needlz
Albums produced by True Master